Fayçal Azizi (born 26 February 1986 in Tetuan) is a Moroccan actor and singer-songwriter. He's known for his song "Werda ala Werda" in the 2006 film The Bitter Orange, his songs with the band K'lma, and his 2015 cover of the Judeo-Moroccan folk song "Hak A Mama."

Life 

Fayçal Azizi started as a stage comedian after gaining admission to the Superior School of Dramatic Arts and Cultural Entertainment in Rabat. He created the music group K'lma in 2004, then joined the troupe Dabateatr in 2007, performing in several theater pieces such as Il/Houwa and Driss Ksikes's180 degrés. He also appeared as Habib in the series Kaboul Kitchen broadcast on the French TV channel Canal+.

Filmography 

 2010: Nassim Abassi's Majid 
 2012: Mohamed Zineddaine's Colère, as Fouad
 2012-2017: Kaboul Kitchen (TV series) on Canal+
 2014: Super Market (TV series) on Al Aoula
 2015: Karim Boukhari's The Wig (short film) 
 2017: Maha Eltaîb's W (Double V), as Mouhiz
 2018: Disk Hayati (TV series) on 2M Maroc
 2019: Moul Bendir on 2M Maroc
 2022: Green Card (Cinema film)

Distinctions 

 May 12, 2015 : Morocco Music Awards 2015 : « The trophy of Electro-Dance category » for Hak A Mama
 March 15, 2018 : TV fiction festival : « The Best Male Interpretation Award »

Discography

K'lma Band 

 Werda ala Werda
 Kif Lmaani
 Elghorba
 Fik Ana Nehia
 Law Kan Triko Hwah
 Mata Nastarih
 Nadem
 Tkellem

Singles 

 Hak a Mama (2015)
 Makayen Bass (2016)
 Meftah Leqloub (2017)
 Memlook (2018)
 Ana Mellit (2018)
 Qolli Alash Kwitini (2019)
 Kif mana (2021)

References 

21st-century Moroccan male singers
Moroccan male actors
1986 births
Living people
Rotana Records artists